This page lists classical pieces in the tuba repertoire, including solo works, concertenti and chamber music of which tuba plays a significant part.

Solo tuba

 Georges Aperghis, Ruinen (1994)
 Malcolm Arnold, Fantasy, Op. 102 (1969)
 Gerald Barry, Foghorn (2020)
 John Cage, Solo for Tuba (1957-1958)
 Elliott Carter, Retracing IV (2011)
 Henning Christiansen, Kirkeby og Edvard Munch, Op. 136 (1981)
 Henning Christiansen, Lettres de Tuba, Op. 164 (1984)
 Henning Christiansen, sTilsTand, Op. 167, 168a (1985)
 Franco Donatoni, Che (1997)
 Vinko Globokar, Échanges (1973)
 Tom Johnson, Monologue For Tuba for Narrating Tubist (1978)
 Tom Johnson, Tilework (2003)
 Mauricio Kagel, Mirum (1965)
 Alvin Lucier, Sestina for 6-valve Tuba (2011)
 Krzysztof Penderecki, Capriccio (1980)
 Vincent Persichetti, Serenade No. 12, Op. 88 (1961)
 Vincent Persichetti, Parable XXII, Op. 147 (1981)
 Frederic Rzewski, Honk (2004)
 Boris Tishchenko, Four Pieces, Op. 94 (1985)
 Christian Wolff, Tuba Song (1992)

Tuba and piano

 Leslie Bassett, Song and Dance (1993)
 Leonard Bernstein, Waltz for Mippy III (1948)
 Bruce Broughton, Sonata (Concerto)
 Bruce Broughton, Turbulence (2011)
 Pierre Max Dubois, Histoires de tuba (1988)
 Vinko Globokar, Juriritubaïoka (1996)
 Sofia Gubaidulina, Lamento (1977)
 Jennifer Higdon, Tuba Songs (2016)
 Paul Hindemith, Tuba Sonata (1955)
 Vagn Holmboe, Tuba Sonata, Op. 162 (1985)
 Bertold Hummel, Sonatina op. 81a (1983)
 Bertold Hummel, 3 Bagatelles op. 95h (1993)
 Rued Langgaard, Dies irae (1948)
 Karlheinz Stockhausen, In Freundschaft, Nr. 4613/14 (1977)
 Josef Tal, Movement (1980)
 Alexander Tcherepnin, Andante, Op. 64 (1939)

Tuba choir

 Bruce Broughton, Jackhammer for 4 Tubas
 Johannes Fritsch, Tubæ for 2 Tubas (2000)
 Per Nørgård, Nu dækker sne den hele jord - Vintersalmer for 8 Tubas (1976)
 Wolfgang von Schweinitz, Horned Owl Sequence, Op. 53 for 2 Tubas (2010)
 Gunther Schuller, Five Moods for 4 Tubas (1973)
 Christian Wolff, Out-take for 2 Tubas (2005)

Tuba and instrument(s)

 Henning Christiansen, Kredsløbsforstyrrelse, Op. 131 for Recitation and Tuba (1980)
 Pierre Max Dubois, Mini quatuor for 2 Piccolos and 2 Tubas (1977)
 Christopher Fox, Hidden Consequences for Microtonal Horn, Trombone and Microtonal Tuba (2009-10)
 Henryk Górecki, Aria, Op. 59 for Tuba, Piano, Tam-tam and Bass Drum (1987)
 Morton Gould, Tuba Suite for Solo Tuba and 3 Horns (1971)
 Alvin Lucier, Sestina for Contrabass Flute, Contrabass Saxophone and Contrabass Tuba (2000)
 Larry Polansky, Two Children's Songs for Trombone and Tuba (1992)
 Larry Polansky, Three Pieces for Trombone and Tuba (2011)
 Gunther Schuller, Refrains for 12 Tubas, 10 Euphoniums and Percussion (2006)
 Galina Ustvolskaya, Dona Nobis Pacem, Composition No. 1 for Piccolo, Tuba and Piano (1971)
 Trevor Wishart, Pastorale / Walden 2, Music Theatre for Tuba, Flute and Tape (1979)
 Charles Wuorinen, Never Again the Same for Bass and Tuba (2006)
 Christian Wolff, Out-take (2005)

Tuba and ensemble

 Bruce Broughton, Concerto (Sonata) for Tuba and Winds (1987)
 Bruce Broughton, Turbulence for Tuba and Winds
 Michael Daugherty, Reflections on the Mississippi for Tuba and Symphonic Band (2015)
 Morton Feldman, Chorus and Instruments II for Choir, Tuba and Chimes (1967)
 Jean Françaix, Petite valse européenne for Tuba and Double Wind Quintet (1979)
 Gordon Jacob, Suite for Tuba and Strings (1972)
 Vagn Holmboe, Intermezzo concertante, Op. 171 for Tuba and String Orchestra (1976)
 David Lang, are you experienced? for Tuba, Narrator and Ensemble (1987)
 :it:Corrado Maria Saglietti, Concertissimo for Tuba and Wind Band (1997) 
 Charles Wuorinen, Chamber Concerto for Tuba, Winds and Drums (1970)

Tuba and orchestra

 Kalevi Aho, Tuba Concerto (2000–01)
 Alexander Arutiunian, Concerto for Tuba (1992)
 Harrison Birtwistle, The Cry of Anubis  (1994)
 Bruce Broughton, Concerto for Tuba (2003)
 Michael Daugherty, Reflections on the Mississippi (2013)
 Jonathan Harvey, Lightness and Weight (1987)
 Jennifer Higdon, Tuba Concerto (2017)
 Vagn Holmboe, Tuba Concerto, Op. 127 (1976)
 Helmut Lachenmann, Harmonica (1981-83)
 Jan Sandström, Lemon House, Tuba Concerto (2002)
 Gunther Schuller, Capriccio (1960)
 Gunther Schuller, Tuba Concerto No. 2 (2008)
 Ralph Vaughan Williams, Concerto in F Minor for Bass Tuba (1954)
 Charles Wuorinen, Prelude to Kullervo (1985)

Tuba, soloist(s) and orchestra

 Bruce Broughton, Oliver's Birthday for Tuba, Piano, Trumpet and Symphonic Band (1998)
 Jennifer Higdon, Low Brass Concerto for 2 Tenor Trombones, Bass Trombone, Tuba and Orchestra (2017)
 André Previn, Triple Concerto for Horn, Trumpet, Tuba and Orchestra (2011)

Electronic / Electroacoustic

 Henning Christiansen, Im Bauch des Wolfs, Op. 165 for 3 Tubas and Tape (1985)
 David Cope, Spirals for Tuba and Tape (1972)
 Karlheinz Essl, Si! for Tenor Tuba, Live Electronics and Surround Sound (2012)
 Luca Francesconi, Animus III for Tuba and Live Electronics (2008)
 Vinko Globokar, Introspection d'un tubiste for Tuba, Electronics and Multimedia (1983)
 Jonathan Harvey, Still for Tuba and Electronics (1997)
 Phill Niblock, B Poore for Taped Tuba (1981)
 Luigi Nono, Post-prae-ludium n. 1 per Donau for Tuba and Live Electronics (1987)
 Bernard Parmegiani, Tuba-ci, Tuba-là for Tuba and Tape (1982)
 Bernard Parmegiani, Tuba-raga for Tuba and Tape (1983)
 Trevor Wishart, Tuba Mirum, Music Theatre for Tuba and Tape (1978)

References

 
 
 

 
Classical music lists